Osceola is a city in, and a dual county seat of, Mississippi County, Arkansas, United States. Located along the Mississippi River within the Arkansas Delta, the settlement was founded in 1837 and incorporated in 1853. Occupying an important location on the river, the city's economy grew as steamboat traffic increased. Timber and cotton harvesting would develop, and the city experienced rapid growth and development throughout the early 20th century. The city's economy has since diversified to include a robust industrial sector. The population was 6,976 at the 2020 census, down from 7,757 in 2010.

History

Prehistory

During the prehistoric period, Osceola and Mississippi County were largely swampland, with dense forest cover. The area was inhabited by Native American tribes. Europeans arrived around the time of the Louisiana Purchase in 1803.

Louisiana Purchase through Statehood

Initial white visitors to the area were speculators, hunters, and outlaws, but the remote region remained sparsely populated by settlers. The extremely intense New Madrid earthquake swarm, produced by the New Madrid Seismic Zone nearby in present-day Missouri, struck the area in 1811–12. The results were widespread soil liquefaction and a change in geography that produced "sunken lands", which were sandy berms of silt and sediment disturbed by the earthquakes.

Following continuing speculation and settlement in the area in the years after the earthquakes, two settlers, William Bard Edrington and John Price Edrington, negotiated the acquisition of Native American lands along the Mississippi River. By this point, the combination of abundant timber as an obvious economic asset and easy access to shippers and travelers along the river began driving growth in the region. In 1837, the settlement adopted the name "Plum Point".

Antebellum period, Civil War and Reconstruction
The Plumb Point community had developed into a successful waypoint on the Mississippi as well as a hub for the timber required to power the steamboats that had become common on America's waterways. Settlers began to explore the uses for the fertile soils now ripe for row agriculture following clearing of the dense forests. It became apparent that the soil supported cotton extremely well, which was already a popular crop elsewhere in the South due to heavy European demand driven by the Industrial Revolution and resulting high market prices. Farmers from other cotton states began to relocate to Mississippi County and throughout the Arkansas Delta, bringing slaves, "King Cotton" culture and the plantation agriculture system with them. In 1853, the community had changed from mostly silviculture to agricultural, had a total of 250 residents, and officially incorporated as "Osceola".

Osceola strongly supported secession in 1861, and raised a volunteer company called the Osceola Hornets to fight for the Confederacy. The unit was under command of Captain Charles Bowen within the 2nd Confederate Infantry. Osceola saw thousands of Union troops enter the area in 1862 in preparation to assault Fort Pillow and Memphis. On the river, the Battle of Plum Point Bend took place between the Confederate River Defense Fleet and the Union Mississippi River Squadron in 1862. Osceola itself was mostly subject to raids from both armies and guerrilla warfare that resulted in burning, pillaging and damage throughout the city.

Following the Civil War, race relations began to tighten between plantation owners who had lost the slave labor that fueled their successful plantations, poor whites who were suddenly in competition for work and social status with freedmen, and the former slaves who continued to face deprivation of their rights despite the war's outcome. Whitecapping by the Ku Klux Klan and other groups promoted a lawless atmosphere in Mississippi County. Violent racial encounters were common in the county and throughout the Arkansas Delta. An extreme example from Mississippi County was nicknamed the Black Hawk War. The racial violence and lawlessness continued to escalate, eventually resulting in Governor Powell Clayton declaring Mississippi County and thirteen other counties under martial law from November 1868 until March 1869.

The New South

Osceola is the county seat of Mississippi County, and is also the seat of one of two judicial districts. Blytheville was named a secondary judicial district in 1901.

Anchoring the town square is the 1912 neoclassical Mississippi County Courthouse, with a copper-roofed dome. The courthouse is bordered by the Hale Avenue Historic District and other structures on the National Historic Register of Historic Places. The Mississippi County Historical Center is located in a 1904 building that once housed a dry goods store.

Osceola is famous for its role in the development of blues music, and many famous blues musicians either came from Osceola or performed there. To celebrate this heritage, Main Street Osceola has been hosting the Osceola Heritage Festival since 1998.

Geography
Osceola is located in east-central Mississippi County at  (35.702276, −89.975807). The city's eastern border follows the levee that protects it from the Mississippi River. To the west the city limits extend as far as Interstate 55 and its Exit 48 (Arkansas Highway 140 / West Keiser Avenue). I-55 leads north  to Blytheville and south  to West Memphis. U.S. Route 61 is the main road through the center of Osceola, using Keiser Avenue and Walnut Street.

Region

The county is located in the Arkansas Delta, one of the six primary geographic regions of Arkansas. The Arkansas Delta is a subregion of the Mississippi Alluvial Plain, which is a flat area consisting of rich, fertile sediment deposits from the Mississippi River between Louisiana and Illinois.

Geology

Osceola is within the New Madrid Seismic Zone, a major seismic zone and a prolific source of intraplate earthquakes. The area experienced the highest magnitude earthquake in North America east of the Rocky Mountains in the 1811–12 New Madrid earthquakes.

Hydrology

The eastern edge of Osceola is the Mississippi River, which is also the state border between Arkansas and Tennessee. The river has provided opportunity for the Osceola since it was founded as a waypoint for river travelers in 1833. Steamboats allowed Osceola to continue to leverage its position on the river as a shipping port for timber and cotton from the surrounding fields.

Although critical to the growth and development of Osceola, the river has also been a source of adversity for the community. The Great Mississippi Flood of 1927, the most destructive river flood in the history of the United States, and another flood in 1937 both damaged Osceola significantly, displacing hundreds of citizens and ruining crops.

Climate
Osceola has a humid subtropical climate (Köppen climate classification Cfa).

Demographics

2020 census

As of the 2020 United States Census, there were 6,976 people, 2,750 households, and 1,728 families residing in the city.

2010 census
As of the 2010 United States Census, there were 7,757 people living in the city. The racial makeup of the city was 53.9% Black, 41.9% White, 0.1% Native American, 0.2% Asian, 0.1% from some other race and 1.3% from two or more races. 2.5% were Hispanic or Latino of any race.

2000 census
As of the census of 2000, there were 8,875 people, 3,183 households, and 2,314 families living in the city. The racial makeup of the city was 47.39% White, 51.03% Black or African American, 0.10% Native American, 0.25% Asian, 0.41% from other races, and 0.82% from two or more races.  1.34% of the population were Hispanic or Latino of any race.

There were 2,724 households, out of which 38.5% had children under the age of 18 living with them, 43.3% were married couples living together, 25.2% had a female householder with no husband present, and 27.3% were non-families. 24.4% of all households were made up of individuals, and 10.3% had someone living alone who was 65 years of age or older.  The average household size was 2.70 and the average family size was 3.20.

In the city, the age distribution of the population shows 29.4% under the age of 18, 11.0% from 18 to 24, 26.4% from 25 to 44, 19.3% from 45 to 64, and 11.3% who were 65 years of age or older.  The median age was 30 years. For every 100 females, there were 90.2 males.  For every 100 females age 18 and over, there were 82.9 males.

The median income for a household in the city was $23,163, and the median income for a family was $26,588. Males had a median income of $27,526 versus $18,788 for females. The per capita income for the city was $16,327.  About 26.0% of families and 31.4% of the population were below the poverty line, including 41.0% of those under age 18 and 25.7% of those age 65 or over.

Government

Mayor–city council
Osceola operates within the mayor-city council form of government. The mayor is elected by a citywide election to serve as the chief executive officer (CEO) of the city by presiding over all city functions, policies, rules and laws. Once elected, the mayor also allocates duties to city employees. The city council consists of six members, two elected from each of the cities three wards, who form the legislative body for the city. Also included in the council's duties is balancing the city's budget and passing ordinances. The body also controls the representatives of specialized city commissions underneath their jurisdiction.

Education 
Public education for early childhood, elementary and secondary students is provided by the Osceola School District, which leads students to graduate from Osceola High School. The mascot and athletic emblem is the Seminole with purple and gold serving as the school colors.

Infrastructure

The City of Osceola Public Works Department contains seven subdivisions responsible for providing essential city services to the citizens and businesses of Osceola. Directly under city administration are the Animal Shelter, Code Enforcement, Fire Department and Police Department. A municipally-owned entity named Osceola Municipal Light & Power houses the Electric, Street and Sanitation, and Water & Wastewater departments.

Electric
Osceola Municipal Light & Power provides power to customers within Osceola, and some nearby customers beyond the city limits via a distribution system they own and operate. The power source is a mixture of city generation facilities and purchased power from Mississippi County Electric Cooperative, a member of Arkansas Electric Cooperative Corporation.

Water/Wastewater
Osceola's source for drinking water is the Wilcox Aquifer, located  beneath the city. Three sites throughout town pump raw water from this aquifer to the ground surface, where air is added to lower the iron content. Next, chlorine, lime and polymer are added to soften the water. A wellhead protection ordinance has been in effect since 2002.

Wastewater is collected from customers and conveyed using gravity sewers, lift stations and force mains. The system has 21 lift stations to pump wastewater over rises in terrain where gravity flow is not economical. At the WWTF, influent wastewater is treated in faculative lagoons in accordance with the city's NPDES permit administrated by the Arkansas Department of Environmental Quality (ADEQ). Water is treated within the lagoons for two to four months before being discharged to the Mississippi River via a pumping station. An industrial pretreatment program has been in effect since 2004.

Industry 
Osceola is home to several industries that manufacture a variety of items. American Greetings, a privately owned American company which is the world's largest greeting card producer, opened in Osceola in 1961 as the largest manufacturing facility under one roof in Arkansas. The plant occupies 2.6 million square feet or 60 acres and is the largest employer in Mississippi County.

In 2016, Big River Steel, a $1.3 billion Flex Mill focused on producing flat-rolled steel for the automotive oil and gas, and electrical energy industries, opened in Osceola, after being announced in 2013. It is the biggest and one of the most technologically advanced construction project to ever take place in Arkansas.

In 2022, Envirotech Electric Vehicles announced that they will move their manufacturing operations from California, USA to Osceola, Arkansas resulting in about 800 jobs and an investment of $80.7 million investment over the next five years. 

Other industry:

 Actagro – Organic and acid-based fertilizers
 Arkansas Steel Processing – Steel Cutting
 Bunge Corp – Agribusiness grain merchandising
 Consolidated Grain and Barge – Agribusiness grain merchandising
 DENSO Manufacturing – Car air conditioners, heavy equipment, radiators
 Evonik CYRO – Acrylic plastic sheeting
 Kagome Creative Foods – Margarine, flavored oils & seasoning
 Mid-River Terminal – Barge loading and unloading
 NAES Plum Point Power Station – 665MW pulverised coal plant
 Producers Mid-South – Cottonseed products & storage
 SMS Millcraft – Industrial Maintenance 
 Systex Products – HVAC molding parts for Toyota
 Telling Industries – Steel studs
 Viskase Corp – Cellulosic casings for the meat industry

Notable people

 Bill Alexander, U.S. Representative from First Congressional District, 1969–1993
 David Barrett, New York Jets cornerback
 Joseph H. Bradford, lawyer and state legislator
 Maurice Carthon, former NFL and USFL player
 Ran Carthon, running back with the Indianapolis Colts
 Dale Evans, wife of Roy Rogers, TV and movie star
 Calvin Frazier, blues guitarist
 Buddy Jewell, the first Nashville Star winner
 Cortez Kennedy, former NFL defensive lineman
 Albert King, blues musician
 Gaylon Nickerson, former NBA player
 Bill Ramsey, played baseball for the Boston Braves
 Billy Lee Riley, Sun Records artist, rockabilly star
 Son Seals, blues guitarist
 Harvey Scales, rhythm and blues and soul music performer
 Jimmy Thomas, soul singer; member of the Ike & Tina Turner Revue
 James Williams, former NFL player
 Kemmons Wilson, Holiday Inn founder
 Reggie Young, guitar legend recording artist, Elvis, Nashville

See also

Notes

References

External links

 

 
Cities in Mississippi County, Arkansas
Cities in Arkansas
Arkansas placenames of Native American origin
Arkansas populated places on the Mississippi River
County seats in Arkansas
Populated places established in 1837
1837 establishments in Arkansas